Return of the Jedi (also known as Star Wars: Episode VI – Return of the Jedi  is a 1983 American epic space opera film directed by Richard Marquand. The screenplay is by Lawrence Kasdan and George Lucas from a story by Lucas, who was also the executive producer. The sequel to Star Wars (1977) and The Empire Strikes Back (1980), it is the third installment in the original Star Wars trilogy, the third film to be produced, and the sixth chronological film in the "Skywalker Saga". The film stars Mark Hamill, Harrison Ford, Carrie Fisher, Billy Dee Williams, Anthony Daniels, David Prowse, Kenny Baker, Peter Mayhew and Frank Oz.

Set one year after The Empire Strikes Back, the Galactic Empire is constructing a second Death Star to exterminate the Rebel Alliance. With intel that the Emperor will be onboard, the Rebel fleet launches a full-scale attack on the Death Star in hopes of both destroying it and the Emperor. Meanwhile, Rebel hero Luke Skywalker, now a Jedi Knight, struggles to bring his father, Darth Vader, back to the light side of the Force.

Following Lucas and Kasdan's discussion on making Return of the Jedi, the film went into production. Steven Spielberg, David Lynch and David Cronenberg were considered to direct the project before Marquand signed on as director. The production team relied on Lucas' storyboards during pre-production. While writing the shooting script, Lucas, Kasdan, Marquand, and producer Howard Kazanjian spent two weeks in conference discussing ideas to construct it. Kazanjian's schedule pushed shooting to begin a few weeks early to allow Industrial Light & Magic more time to work on the film's effects in post-production.

The film was released in theaters on May 25, 1983. It grossed $374 million during its initial theatrical run, becoming the highest-grossing film of 1983. Overall, the film was well-received by critics, with strong praise going to the special effects and action sequences, performances, John Williams' score, and emotional weight. Several re-releases and revisions to the film have followed over the decades, which has also brought its total gross to $475 million. The United States Library of Congress selected it for preservation in the National Film Registry in 2021.

Plot 

A year after Han Solo's capture, C-3PO and R2-D2 are sent to crime lord Jabba the Hutt's palace on Tatooine in a trade bargain made by Luke Skywalker to rescue Han, who is still frozen in carbonite. Disguised as the bounty hunter Boushh, Princess Leia infiltrates the palace under the pretense of collecting the bounty on Chewbacca and unfreezes Han, but is caught and enslaved. Luke soon arrives to bargain for his friends' release, but Jabba drops him through a trapdoor to be eaten by a rancor. After Luke kills it, Jabba sentences him, Han, and Chewbacca to death by being fed to the sarlacc, a deadly beast entombed in the desert floor that digests its prey over the course of a millennium. Having hidden his new lightsaber inside , Luke frees himself and his friends, and they battle Jabba's men aboard the crime lord's sail barge. During the chaos, Boba Fett falls into the sarlacc after Han inadvertently damages his jet pack, and Leia strangles Jabba to death with her chains. The group destroy Jabba's sail barge and escape.

As the others rendezvous with the Rebel Alliance, Luke returns to Dagobah to complete his Jedi training with Yoda, whom he discovers is dying. Yoda confirms that Darth Vader, once the Jedi knight Anakin Skywalker, is Luke's father, and reveals that there is another Skywalker, before vanishing and becoming one with the Force. Obi-Wan Kenobi's Force spirit then tells Luke that Leia is his twin sister, and that he must face Vader again to finish his training and defeat the Empire.

The Alliance learns that the Empire has been constructing a second Death Star under the supervision of the Emperor. As the station is protected by an energy shield, Han leads a strike team which includes Luke, Leia and Chewbacca to destroy the shield generator on the forest moon of Endor; doing so will allow the Rebel fleet to destroy the Death Star. The team uses a stolen Imperial shuttle to arrive undetected and encounters a tribe of Ewoks, gaining their trust after an initial conflict. Later, Luke tells Leia that she is his sister, Vader is their father, and that he must confront him. Surrendering to Imperial troops, he is brought before Vader, and fails to convince him to reject the dark side of the Force.

Vader brings Luke to the Emperor, who intends to turn him to the dark side, and reveals that his friends and the Rebel fleet are headed into a trap. On Endor, Han's team is captured by Imperial forces, but a counterattack by the Ewoks allows the Rebels to infiltrate the shield generator. Meanwhile, Lando Calrissian in the Millennium Falcon and Admiral Ackbar lead the Rebel assault on the Death Star, finding its shield still active and the Imperial fleet waiting for them.

The Emperor reveals to Luke that the Death Star is fully operational and orders the firing of its superlaser, destroying a Rebel starship. He tempts Luke to give in to his anger. Luke attempts to attack him, but Vader intervenes and the two engage in a lightsaber duel. Vader senses that Luke has a sister and threatens to turn her to the dark side if Luke does not. In retaliation, Luke defeats Vader, severing his prosthetic hand. The Emperor orders Luke to take Vader's place, but Luke refuses, declaring himself to be a Jedi, like his father before him. Enraged, the Emperor begins torturing Luke to death with Force lightning. Unwilling to let his son die, Vader betrays the Emperor by throwing him down a reactor shaft to his death, but he is mortally electrocuted in the process. At his redeemed father's last request, Luke removes Anakin’s mask and after a brief talk, he dies peacefully in Luke's arms.

After the strike team destroys the shield generator, Lando leads Rebel fighters into the Death Star's core. While the Rebel fleet destroys the Imperial command ship, Lando and X-wing fighter pilot Wedge Antilles destroy the Death Star's main reactor and escape before the station explodes. Meanwhile, Luke escapes in a shuttle. On Endor, Leia reveals to Han that Luke is her brother. Luke burns Vader's armor on a pyre and reunites with his friends.

Cast 

 Mark Hamill as Luke Skywalker, one of the last living Jedi Knights, trained by Obi-Wan Kenobi and Yoda; Leia's twin brother, Han's friend and Darth Vader's son who is also a skilled X-wing fighter pilot in the Rebellion.
 Harrison Ford as Han Solo, captain of the Millennium Falcon who becomes a General in the Rebellion; Luke's friend, and Leia's love interest.
 Carrie Fisher as Leia Organa, the former princess of the destroyed planet Alderaan, who is a leader of the Rebellion, Luke's twin sister, and Han's love interest.
 Billy Dee Williams as Lando Calrissian, the former Administrator of Cloud City who has become a general in the Rebellion, Han's old friend, and the previous owner of the Millennium Falcon
 Anthony Daniels as C-3PO, a humanoid protocol droid in the service of the Rebellion and longtime companion of R2-D2.
 Peter Mayhew as Chewbacca, a Wookiee who is Han's longtime friend, co-pilot of the Millennium Falcon, and part of the Rebellion.
 Kenny Baker as
 R2-D2, an astromech droid in the service of the Rebellion, loyal to Luke, and longtime companion of C-3PO.
 Paploo, an Ewok who distracts Scout troopers by hijacking a speeder bike.
 Ian McDiarmid as The Emperor, the founder and supreme ruler of the Galactic Empire, and Darth Vader's Sith master. Alan Webb was originally cast in the role but he dropped out due to illness. Lindsay Anderson was offered the role but he declined due to scheduling conflicts with Britannia Hospital. Ben Kingsley and David Suchet were also considered.
 Frank Oz as Yoda, a wise, centuries-old Jedi Master of an unknown alien species, who lives in exile on Dagobah and trained Luke.
 David Prowse as Darth Vader, a powerful Sith lord, the Emperor's apprentice, and second-in-command of the Empire; Luke and Leia's father.
 James Earl Jones as Darth Vader's voice
 Sebastian Shaw as Anakin Skywalker
 Alec Guinness as Obi-Wan Kenobi, the deceased Jedi mentor of Luke, and of his father before him, who continues to guide Luke in his journey as a Force spirit.

Denis Lawson reprises his role as Wedge Antilles, an X-wing pilot in the Rebellion, from the previous two films. Kenneth Colley and Jeremy Bulloch reprise their roles from The Empire Strikes Back as Admiral Piett, the commander of Darth Vader's flagship, the Executor, and bounty hunter Boba Fett, respectively. Michael Pennington portrays Moff Jerjerrod, the commander of the second Death Star. Warwick Davis made his feature film debut and appears as Wicket W. Warrick, an Ewok who befriends Princess Leia and leads her and her friends to the Ewok tribe. Baker had originally auditioned for the role as Wicket, but was replaced by Davis after falling ill with food poisoning on the morning of the shoot. Davis had no previous film acting experience and was cast only after his grandmother discovered an open call for dwarfs for the new Star Wars film. Caroline Blakiston portrays Mon Mothma, a co-founder and leader of the Rebel Alliance. Michael Carter plays Jabba the Hutt's aide, Bib Fortuna (voiced by Erik Bauersfeld), while Femi Taylor and Claire Davenport appear as Jabba's original slave dancers.

To portray the numerous alien species featured in the film a multitude of puppeteers, voice actors, and stunt performers were employed. Admiral Ackbar, the commander of the Rebel Fleet during the Battle of Endor, was performed by puppeteer Tim Rose, with his voice provided by Erik Bauersfeld. Nien Nunb, who copilots the Millennium Falcon alongside Lando in the film, was portrayed by Richard Bonehill in costume for full body shots, while he was otherwise a puppet operated by Mike Quinn, and his voice was provided by Kipsang Rotich. Rose also operated Salacious B. Crumb, whose voice was provided by Mark Dodson. Quinn also played Ree-Yees and Wol Cabbashite. Sy Snootles was a marionette operated by Rose and Quinn, while her voice was provided by Annie Arbogast. Others included Simon J. Williamson as Max Rebo, a Gamorrean Guard and a Mon Calamari; Deep Roy as Droopy McCool; Ailsa Berk as Amanaman; Paul Springer as Ree-Yees, Gamorrean Guard and a Mon Calamari; Hugh Spight as a Gamorrean Guard, Elom and a Mon Calamari; Swee Lim as Attark the Hoover; Richard Robinson as a Yuzzum; Gerald Home as Tessek and a Mon Calamari officer; Phil Herbert as Hermi Odle; Tik and Tok (Tim Dry and Sean Crawford) as Whiphid and Yak-Face; Phil Tippett as the Rancor with Michael McCormick; and Pat Welsh as the voice of Boushh.

Jabba the Hutt was operated by Toby Philpott, David Barclay, and Mike Edmonds (who also portrays the Ewok Logray). Larry Ward portrays the Huttese language voice with Quinn, among other roles, controlling the eyes. Barclay, Quinn, and David Greenaway assisted Frank Oz in performing Yoda.

Alan Rickman auditioned for the role of Moff Jerjerrod but lost the role to Michael Pennington.

Production

Development 
Following discussions between Star Wars creator George Lucas and producer Howard Kazanjian, a sequel to The Empire Strikes Back was swiftly put into production. As with the previous film, Lucas personally financed Return of the Jedi. Lucas also chose not to direct Return of the Jedi himself, and started searching for a director. Although Lucas' first choice was Steven Spielberg, their separate feuds with the Director's Guild led to his being banned from directing the film. Lucas approached David Lynch, who had recently been nominated for the Academy Award for Best Director for The Elephant Man in 1980, to helm Return of the Jedi, but Lynch declined, saying that he had "next door to zero interest". David Cronenberg was also offered the chance to direct, but he declined the offer to make Videodrome and The Dead Zone. Lamont Johnson, director of Spacehunter: Adventures in the Forbidden Zone, was also considered. Lucas eventually chose Richard Marquand. Lucas may have directed some of the second unit work personally as the shooting threatened to go over schedule; this is a function Lucas had willingly performed on previous occasions when he had only officially been producing a film (e.g. More American Graffiti, Raiders of the Lost Ark). Lucas did operate the B camera on the set a few times. Lucas himself has admitted to being on the set frequently because of Marquand's relative inexperience with special effects. Lucas praised Marquand as a "very nice person who worked well with actors". Marquand did note that Lucas kept a conspicuous presence on set, joking, "It is rather like trying to direct King Lear – with Shakespeare in the next room!"

The screenplay was written by Lawrence Kasdan and Lucas (with uncredited contributions by David Peoples and Marquand), based on Lucas' story. Kasdan claims he told Lucas that Return of the Jedi was "a weak title", and Lucas later decided to name the film Revenge of the Jedi. Kazanjian said the same to Lucas, and the title changed to Revenge of the Jedi one or two days later. The screenplay itself was not finished until rather late in pre-production, well after a production schedule and budget had been created by Kazanjian and Marquand had been hired, which was unusual for a film. Instead, the production team relied on Lucas' story and rough draft in order to commence work with the art department. When it came time to formally write a shooting script, Lucas, Kasdan, Marquand and Kazanjian spent two weeks in conference discussing ideas; Kasdan used tape transcripts of these meetings to then construct the script.

The issue of whether Harrison Ford would return for the final film arose during pre-production. Unlike the other stars of the first film, Ford had not contracted to do two sequels, and Raiders of the Lost Ark had made him an even bigger star. Kazanjian (who also produced Raiders of the Lost Ark) convinced Ford to return:
I played a very important part in bringing Harrison back for Return of the Jedi. Harrison, unlike Carrie Fisher and Mark Hamill signed only a two picture contract. That is why he was frozen in carbonite in The Empire Strikes Back. When I suggested to George we should bring him back, I distinctly remember him saying that Harrison would never return. I said what if I convinced him to return. George simply replied that we would then write him in to Jedi. I had just recently negotiated his deal for Raiders of the Lost Ark with Phil Gersh of the Gersh Agency. I called Phil who said he would speak with Harrison. When I called back again, Phil was on vacation. David, his son, took the call and we negotiated Harrison's deal. When Phil returned to the office several weeks later he called me back and said I had taken advantage of his son in the negotiations. I had not. But agents are agents.
Ford suggested that Han Solo be killed through self-sacrifice. Kasdan concurred, saying it should happen near the beginning of the third act to instill doubt as to whether the others would survive, but Lucas was vehemently against it and rejected the concept. Gary Kurtz, who produced Star Wars and The Empire Strikes Back but was replaced as producer for Return of the Jedi by Kazanjian, said in 2010 that the ongoing success with Star Wars merchandise and toys led George Lucas to reject the idea of killing off Han Solo in the middle part of the film during a raid on an Imperial base. Luke Skywalker was also to have walked off alone and exhausted like the hero in a Spaghetti Western but, according to Kurtz, Lucas opted for a happier ending to encourage higher merchandise sales. Harrison Ford himself has agreed with this sentiment, saying that Lucas "didn't see any future in dead Han toys."

Yoda was originally not meant to appear in the film, but Marquand strongly felt that returning to Dagobah was essential to resolve the dilemma raised by the previous film. The inclusion led Lucas to insert a scene in which Yoda confirms that Darth Vader is Luke's father because, after a discussion with a children's psychologist, he did not want younger moviegoers to dismiss Vader's claim as a lie. Many ideas from the original script were left out or changed. For instance, the Ewoks were going to be Wookiees and the Millennium Falcon would be used in the arrival at the forest moon of Endor. Following the defeat of the Emperor, the film was originally intended to end with Obi-Wan Kenobi and Yoda returning to life from their spectral existence in the Force, along with Anakin Skywalker, thanks to Yoda being able to prevent him from becoming one with the Force. They would then join the rest of the characters in their celebration on Endor.

Filming 

Filming began on January 11, 1982, and lasted through May 20, 1982, a schedule six weeks shorter than The Empire Strikes Back. Kazanjian's schedule pushed shooting as early as possible in order to give Industrial Light & Magic (ILM) as much time as possible to work on effects, and left some crew members dubious of their ability to be fully prepared for the shoot. Working on a budget of $32.5 million, Lucas was determined to avoid going over budget as had happened with The Empire Strikes Back. Kazanjian estimated that using ILM (owned wholly by Lucasfilm) for special effects saved the production approximately $18 million. However, the fact that Lucasfilm was a non-union company made acquiring shooting locations more difficult and more expensive, even though Star Wars and The Empire Strikes Back had been big hits. The project was given the working title Blue Harvest with a tagline of "Horror Beyond Imagination." This disguised what the production crew was really filming from fans and the press, and also prevented price gouging by service providers.

The first stage of production started with 78 days at Elstree Studios in England, where the film occupied all nine stages. The shoot commenced with a scene later deleted from the finished film where the heroes get caught in a sandstorm as they leave Tatooine. (This was the only major sequence cut from the film during editing.) While attempting to film Luke Skywalker's battle with the rancor beast, Lucas insisted on trying to create the scene in the same style as Toho's Godzilla films by using a stunt performer wearing a suit. The production team made several attempts, but were unable to create an adequate result. Lucas eventually relented and decided to film the rancor as a high-speed puppet. In April, the crew moved to the Yuma Desert in Arizona for two weeks of Tatooine exteriors. Production then moved to the redwood forests of northern California near Crescent City where two weeks were spent shooting the Endor forest exteriors, and then concluded at ILM in San Rafael, California for about ten days of bluescreen shots. One of two "skeletal" post-production units shooting background matte plates spent a day in Death Valley. The other was a special Steadicam unit shooting forest backgrounds from June 15 to June 17, 1982, for the speeder chase near the middle of the film. Steadicam inventor Garrett Brown personally operated these shots as he walked through a disguised path inside the forest shooting at less than one frame per second. Darth Vader's small funeral was filmed at Skywalker Ranch.

Harrison Ford altered some scenes during the shoot, causing Billy Dee Williams to forget some of his lines, which was a source of frustration for Marquand. Marquand and Anthony Daniels also clashed somewhat, leading to the latter recording his ADR with Lucas instead.

Post-production 
While Lucasfilm was testing the film in a commercial theater, they would begin running into troubles. George Lucas and his employees could not hear many of the sound effects they had mixed. For instance, during one of the classic Princess Leia scenes, her theme was nowhere to be heard. The timeless soundtrack and sound effects that made Star Wars so memorable were not there. To make matters worse, the background noise in the theater became so bad that it muffled the majority of the sound from the film when it was played through the theater's commercial sound system. Many theaters at the time had poor room acoustics with mono surround sound. Lucas would solve the problem by ensuring that the theaters played his movies would project all of the intended sound he heard during the mix. Therefore, he decided to create a new company called THX. Meanwhile, special effects work at ILM quickly stretched the company to its operational limits. While the R&D work and experience gained from the previous two films in the trilogy allowed for increased efficiency, this was offset by the desire to have the closing film raise the bar set by each of these films. A compounding factor was the intention of several departments of ILM to either take on other film work or decrease staff during slow cycles. Instead, as soon as production began, the entire company found it necessary to remain running 20 hours a day on six-day weeks in order to meet their goals by April 1, 1983. Of about 900 special effects shots, all VistaVision optical effects remained in-house, since ILM was the only company capable of using the format, while about 400 4-perf opticals were subcontracted to outside effects houses.

Music 

John Williams composed and conducted the film's musical score with performances by the London Symphony Orchestra. Orchestration credits also include Thomas Newman. The initial release of the film's soundtrack was on the RSO Records label in the United States. Sony Classical Records acquired the rights to the classic trilogy scores in 2004 after gaining the rights to release the second trilogy soundtracks (The Phantom Menace and Attack of the Clones). In the same year, Sony Classical re-pressed the 1997 RCA Victor release of Return of the Jedi along with the other two films in the trilogy. The set was released with the new artwork mirroring the first DVD release of the film. Despite the Sony digital re-mastering, which minimally improved the sound heard only on high-end stereos, this 2004 release is essentially the same as the 1997 RCA Victor release.

Release 

Return of the Jedis theatrical release took place on May 25, 1983. It was originally slated to be May 27, but was subsequently changed to coincide with the date of the 1977 release of the original Star Wars film. With a massive worldwide marketing campaign, illustrator Tim Reamer created the image for the movie poster and other advertising. At the time of its release, the film was advertised on posters and merchandise as simply Star Wars: Return of the Jedi, despite its on-screen "Episode VI" distinction. The original film was later re-released to theaters in 1985.

In 1997, for the 20th anniversary of the release of Star Wars (re-titled Episode IV: A New Hope), Lucas released the Star Wars Trilogy: Special Edition. Along with the two other films in the original trilogy, Return of the Jedi was rereleased on March 14, 1997 (moved up one week from its original announced release date of March 7 due to the box office success of The Empire Strikes Back the month prior), with a number of changes and additions, including the insertion of several alien band members and a different song in Jabba's throne room, the modification of the sarlacc to include a beak, the replacement of music at the closing scene, and a montage of different alien worlds celebrating the fall of the Empire. The runtime of the 1997 Special Edition of the film and all subsequent releases is approximately five minutes longer than the original theatrical version.

Title change 
The original teaser trailer for the film carried the name Revenge of the Jedi. In December 1982, Lucas decided that "Revenge" was not appropriate as a 'true Jedi should never seek revenge' and returned to his original title. By that time thousands of "Revenge" teaser posters (with artwork by Drew Struzan) had been printed and distributed. Lucasfilm stopped the shipping of the posters and sold the remaining stock of 6,800 posters to Star Wars fan club members for $9.50.

Star Wars: Episode III – Revenge of the Sith, released in 2005 as part of the prequel trilogy, later alluded to the dismissed title Revenge of the Jedi.

Home media 

The original theatrical version of Return of the Jedi was released on VHS and Laserdisc several times between 1986 and 1995, followed by releases of the Special Edition in the same formats between 1997 and 2000. Some of these releases contained featurettes; some were individual releases of just this film, while others were boxed sets of all three original films.

On September 21, 2004, the original Star Wars trilogy was released in a boxset on DVD with digital restoration and additional alterations made by Lucas.
In this version of Return of the Jedi, Sebastian Shaw's portrayal of Anakin's spirit is replaced by Hayden Christensen, who portrayed Anakin in Attack of the Clones and Revenge of the Sith. All three films of the trilogy were released individually on Limited Edition DVDs on September 12, 2006, with the original unaltered versions included as bonus features. These were collected in a box set on November 4, 2008.

A Blu-ray Disc version of the six-film Star Wars saga was released in September 2011, which incorporated more small changes to Return of the Jedi, including making the Ewoks blink and having Vader yell "No!" as he throws the Emperor down the Death Star shaft; the latter change drew sharp negative criticism. Several deleted scenes from the film were included as special features, including a completed scene in which Vader communicates with Luke via the Force as Luke assembles his new lightsaber before infiltrating Jabba's palace, a sandstorm sequence following the sarlacc pit rescue, and a scene featuring Moff Jerjerrod and Death Star officers during the Battle of Endor.

On April 7, 2015, Walt Disney Studios, 20th Century Fox, and Lucasfilm jointly announced the digital releases of the six released Star Wars films. Return of the Jedi was released through the iTunes Store, Amazon Video, Vudu, Google Play, and Disney Movies Anywhere on April 10, 2015.

Walt Disney Studios Home Entertainment reissued Return of the Jedi on Blu-ray, DVD, and digital download on September 22, 2019. Additionally, all six films were available for 4K HDR and Dolby Atmos streaming on Disney+ upon the service's launch on November 12, 2019. This version of the film was released by Disney on 4K Ultra HD Blu-ray box set on March 31, 2020.

Reception

Box office 

Return of the Jedi grossed $309.3 million in the United States and Canada, and $166 million in other territories, for a worldwide total of $475.3 million, against a production budget of about $32.5 million.

The film made $23 million from 1,002 theaters in its opening weekend and grossed a record $45.3 million in its opening week. It finished first at the box office for six of its first seven weeks of release, only coming in second once behind Superman III in its fourth weekend. Box Office Mojo estimates that the film sold over 80 million tickets in the US in its initial theatrical run. When it was re-released in 1985, it made $11.2 million, which totaled its initial theatrical gross to $385.8 million worldwide.

Critical response 
According to the review aggregator website Rotten Tomatoes, 83% of critics have given the film a positive review with an average rating of 7.30/10, based on  reviews from critics. The site's critics consensus reads: "Though failing to reach the cinematic heights of its predecessors, Return of the Jedi remains an entertaining sci-fi adventure and a fitting end to the classic trilogy." At Metacritic, the film has a weighted average score of 58 out of 100 based on 24 reviews from mainstream critics, indicating "mixed or average reviews".

Film critic Roger Ebert gave the film four out of four stars, calling it "a complete entertainment, a feast for the eyes and a delight for the fancy. It's a little amazing how Lucas and his associates keep topping themselves." Gene Siskel of the Chicago Tribune also gave the film four stars out of four and wrote, "From the moment that the familiar Star Wars introductory words begin to crawl up the screen, Return of the Jedi is a childlike delight. It's the best video game around. And for the professional moviegoers, it is particularly enjoyable to watch every facet of filmmaking at its best."

James Harwood of Variety called the film "a visual treat throughout," but thought that "Hamill is not enough of a dramatic actor to carry the plot load here" and Harrison Ford "is present more in body than in spirit this time, given little to do but react to special effects. And it can't be said that either Carrie Fisher or Billy Dee Williams rise to previous efforts. But Lucas and director Richard Marquand have overwhelmed these performer flaws with a truly amazing array of creatures, old and new, plus the familiar space hardware." Sheila Benson of the Los Angeles Times wrote that the film "is fully satisfying, it gives honest value to all the hopes of its believers. With this last of the central Star Wars cycle, there is the sense of the closing of a circle, of leaving behind real friends. It is accomplished with a weight and a new maturity that seem entirely fitting, yet the movie has lost none of its sense of fun; it bursts with new inventiveness."

Gary Arnold of The Washington Post said, "Return of the Jedi, a feat of mass enchantment, puts the happy finishing touches on George Lucas' Star Wars saga. It was worth the wait, and the work is now an imposing landmark in contemporary popular culture—a three-part, 6¼-hour science-fiction epic of unabashed heroic proclivities." The film was also featured on the May 23, 1983, TIME magazine cover issue (where it was labeled "Star Wars III"), where the reviewer Gerald Clarke said that while it was not as exciting as the first Star Wars film, it was "better and more satisfying" than The Empire Strikes Back, now considered by many as the best of the original trilogy.

Vincent Canby of The New York Times called Return of the Jedi "by far the dimmest adventure of the lot" and stated, "The joys of watching space battles as envisioned by wizards in studios and laboratories are not inexhaustible." Pauline Kael of The New Yorker stated, "Some of the trick effects might seem miraculous if the imagery had any lustre, but Return of the Jedi is an impersonal and rather junky piece of moviemaking."

Christopher John reviewed The Return of the Jedi in Ares Magazine #15 and commented that "Star Wars may not be dead, but Return of the Jedi is a failure, and is a cheap and tarnished crown for the series which shook the world of film when it started out . . . a long time ago, in that galaxy far, far away."

Colin Greenland reviewed Return of the Jedi for Imagine magazine, and stated that "You would think a series like Star Wars, fuelled by public adoration, coasting along on the hyperdrive of its own hyperboles, would get inexorably worse. It is not. It is getting better."

Accolades 

At the 56th Academy Awards in 1984, Richard Edlund, Dennis Muren, Ken Ralston, and Phil Tippett received the "Special Achievement Award for Visual Effects." Norman Reynolds, Fred Hole, James L. Schoppe, and Michael Ford were nominated for "Best Art Direction/Set Decoration". Ben Burtt received a nomination for "Best Sound Effects Editing". John Williams received the nomination for "Best Music, Original Score". Burtt, Gary Summers, Randy Thom and Tony Dawe all received the nominations for "Best Sound".

At the 1984 BAFTA Awards, Edlund, Muren, Ralston, and Kit West won for "Best Special Visual Effects". Tippett and Stuart Freeborn were also nominated for "Best Makeup". Reynolds received a nomination for "Best Production Design/Art Direction". Burtt, Dawe, and Summers also received nominations for "Best Sound". Williams was also nominated "Best Album of Original Score Written for a Motion Picture or Television Special". The film also won for "Best Dramatic Presentation", the older award for science fiction and fantasy in film, at the 1984 Hugo Awards.

In 2021, the film was selected for preservation in the United States National Film Registry by the Library of Congress for being "culturally, historically, or aesthetically significant".

 American Film Institute Lists
 AFI's 100 Years ... 100 Movies – Nominated
 AFI's 100 Years ... 100 Thrills – Nominated

Legacy 
James Kendrick of Q Network Film Desk, reviewing the 1997 Special Edition re-release, assessed Return of the Jedi as "the least of the three" original films, but "still a magnificent experience in its own right. Its main problem is that it tends to lean too much on the slick commercialism generated by the first two installments." ReelViews.net's James Berardinelli wrote of the Special Edition:

While the Sarlacc battle sequence, the speeder bike chase, the space battle, and Luke's duel against Vader are all well-regarded, the battle between Ewoks and stormtroopers remains controversial. Fans are divided on the likelihood of Ewoks (being a primitive race of small creatures) defeating an armed ground force comprising the Empire's "best troops". Lucas has defended the scenario, saying that the Ewoks' purpose was to distract the Imperial troops and they did not really win. His inspiration for the Ewoks' victory came from the Vietnam War, where the Viet Cong prevailed against the technologically superior United States.

Marketing

Novelization 

The novelization of Return of the Jedi was written by James Kahn and was released on May 12, 1983, thirteen days before the film's release.

Radio drama 

A three-hour radio drama adaptation of the film was written by Brian Daley with additional material contributed by John Whitman and was produced for and broadcast on National Public Radio in 1996 (over a decade after the radio adaptations of the first two Star Wars films). It was based on characters and situations created by George Lucas and on the screenplay by Kasdan and Lucas. Anthony Daniels reprised his role from the film as C-3PO, but Mark Hamill and Billy Dee Williams (who lent their voices to the previous radio adaptations) were replaced by newcomer Joshua Fardon and character actor Arye Gross, respectively. Bernard Behrens and Brock Peters reprised their roles as Obi-Wan Kenobi and Darth Vader, respectively. John Lithgow voiced Yoda, and veteran character actor Ed Begley, Jr. played Boba Fett. Ed Asner voiced Jabba the Hutt, speaking only in grunts.

Comic book adaptation 

Marvel Comics published a comic book adaptation of the film by writer Archie Goodwin and artists Al Williamson, Carlos Garzon, Tom Palmer, and Ron Frenz. The adaptation appeared in Marvel Super Special #27 and as a four-issue limited series. It was later reprinted in a mass market paperback, as well as collections of Marvel's self-titled Star Wars series. Marvel Super Special #27 was mistakenly released in April 1983, a month before the film itself, giving away spoilers to the film's plot. Hamill is a comic book fan and while he was in a comic book store, he discovered that the comic book was on sale there and alerted Lucasfilm. According to Carol Kalish who was Marvel's direct sales manager at the time, Marvel quickly recalled the book upon learning this mistake though it did not stop the premature revelation of the secrets of the film's plot. Kalish kept her job, as did everyone else in the Sales Department, as the incident was apparently considered a simple mistake.

Book-and-record set 
Lucasfilm adapted the story for a children's book-and-record set. Released in 1983, the 24-page Star Wars: Return of the Jedi read-along book was accompanied by a 33⅓ rpm  gramophone record. Each page of the book contained a cropped frame from the film with an abridged and condensed version of the story. The record was produced by Buena Vista Records.

Prequels and sequels 

16 years after the release of Return of the Jedi, Lucas wrote and directed the prequel trilogy, consisting of the films The Phantom Menace, Attack of the Clones, and Revenge of the Sith. The films chronicle the history between Obi-Wan Kenobi and Anakin Skywalker, and the latter's fall to the darkside and transformation into Darth Vader. The prequel trilogy was financially successful, and polarized critics and fans on their release for the storylines and some new characters. After Lucas sold the Star Wars franchise to The Walt Disney Company in 2012, Disney developed a sequel trilogy, consisting of The Force Awakens, The Last Jedi, and The Rise of Skywalker. Original trilogy cast including Ford, Hamill, and Fisher reprised their roles, alongside new characters portrayed by Daisy Ridley, John Boyega, Adam Driver, and Oscar Isaac. Standalone films and television series have also been released, exploring adventures set around the main trilogy arcs. Most relevantly, the Disney+ streaming shows The Book of Boba Fett, The Mandalorian and the latter's upcoming spin-offs are set beginning a few years after Return of the Jedi, and bridge the time period between that film and The Force Awakens.

See also 
 Princess Leia's bikini

Notes

References

Works cited

External links 

  at 
  at 
 
 
 
 
 
 

 
1980s science fiction action films
1983 films
1983 science fiction films
20th Century Fox films
American science fiction war films
American sequel films
BAFTA winners (films)
Cyborg films
Films about father–son relationships
Fiction about regicide
Films about orphans
Films about twins
Films directed by Richard Marquand
Puppet films
Films produced by Howard Kazanjian
Films scored by John Williams
Films set in deserts
Films set in forests
Films set in palaces
Films shot at EMI-Elstree Studios
Films shot in Arizona
Films shot in California
Films shot in England
Films shot in Hertfordshire
Films using stop-motion animation
Films with screenplays by George Lucas
Guerrilla warfare in film
Hugo Award for Best Dramatic Presentation winning works
Jedi
Lucasfilm films
Prosthetics in fiction
Fiction about rebellions
Star Wars Skywalker Saga films
Science fiction adventure films
Science fantasy films
United States National Film Registry films
1980s English-language films
1980s American films